Cesare Torelli Romano was an Italian painter.

He was born in Rome, and a pupil of Giovanni de' Vecchi. He flourished in the pontificate of Paul V, and was employed both as a painter and a mosaicist in the library of the Vatican, and in the Scala Santa at San Giovanni in Laterano. He painted two Sibyls in the church of the Madonna dell'Orto in Venice. He died in 1615.

A sculptor of the same name was active in late 19th-century Florence, specializing in genre statuettes.

References

Sources

1615 deaths
17th-century Italian painters
Italian male painters
Mannerist painters
Painters from Rome
Year of birth unknown